Konrad Petzold (26 April 1930, Radebeul - 12 November 1999, Kleinmachnow) was a German film director, writer and actor.

Biography
Born the youngest of six children in a poor family, he was the son of a worker and a housewife. After an internship at the Film and TV School of the Academy of Performing Arts in Prague (FAMU), he shot his first feature film in Czechoslovakia in 1955, a comedy called The Fools Among Us. His next film was an adventure film, A Dog in the Marsh, which brought him national recognition, especially among young people. However his next movie The Dress (1961), based on "The Emperor's New Clothes", was accused of hidden political satire, and he was temporarily dismissed from the profession.

In 1969, Petzold shot the first of five "american-indian films".

Selected filmography
 Die Fahrt nach Bamsdorf (1956)
 Abenteuer in Bamsdorf (1958)
 Natürlich die Nelli (1959)
 Der Moorhund (1960)
 The Dress (co-director: Egon Günther, 1961)
 Die Jagd nach dem Stiefel (1962)
 Das Lied vom Trompeter (1964)
 Alfons Zitterbacke (1966)
 Weiße Wölfe (1969)

External links

1930 births
1999 deaths
People from Radebeul
Film directors from Saxony
Recipients of the Banner of Labor